Senese is an Italian surname derived from the city of Siena. Notable people with this surname include:

James Senese (born 1945), Italian saxophonist, composer and singer-songwriter
Joy Philbin (née Senese; born 1941), American television personality 
Mike Senese (born 1975), American television host
Richard Senese, American psychologist, academic administrator, and politician

See also
Senesi